Martina Eileen Hernandez delas Alas-Sibayan (born November 11, 1964), known professionally as Ai-Ai delas Alas, is a Filipina singer, actress and comedian. She is widely regarded as the country's "Queen of Comedy" for her comedic talent and best known for her role in the film Ang Tanging Ina (2003), which became a blockbuster hit. On account of the film's popularity, a television series spin-off was produced, as well as three sequels: Ang Tanging Ina N'yong Lahat (2008), Ang Tanging Ina Mo (Last na 'To!) (2010) and Enteng ng Ina Mo (2011), with delas Alas reprising her role. She also appeared in the comedy film Our Mighty Yaya, which premiered on May 10, 2017, through Regal Entertainment.

Early and personal life
Delas Alas is the daughter of Rosendo delas Alas (1920–2008) and Gregoria delas Alas née Hernández (died December 30, 2013), and was later adopted by her older, unmarried aunt, Justa delas Alas. She earned a mass communication degree from Far Eastern University (FEU) in 1985.

She was married to actor Miguel Vera, with whom she had two children; she also has a son from a previous relationship with Hernan Jeng Jeng Viola, a guitarist. Before acting, she worked as a sales assistant in a department store, and also performed as a stand-up comic in comedy bars around Metro Manila. On April 3, 2013, she married Jed Salang, at the time a 28-year-old unemployed man who was 20 years her junior. The marriage ended after a month, with delas Alas confirming their separation on May 19, 2013. Delas Alas confirmed through Instagram her engagement to Gerald Sibayan in April 2017; the two married in November 2017.

She is also cousins with Ogie Alcasid.

Career
Delas Alas started her career on GMA Network back in 1991, as a host of Saturday late-night musical variety show RSVP, with Dawn Zulueta and Ariel Urieta. Delas Alas co-hosted GMA noontime shows Lunch Date (1991–1993), SST: Salo-Salo Together (1993–1995) and Eat Bulaga! (2000). She was a member of the cast of GMA sitcoms Ibang Klase with Joey De Leon, Jessa Zaragosa, Mark Anthony Fernandez and Aiza Seguerra in 1997–1998, and 1 for 3 with Vic Sotto and Rosanna Roces between 1999 and 2001.

Delas Alas has acted in several films, including Ang Tanging Ina from Star Cinema, which became the highest-grossing film of 2003. It was followed by more comedy films like Volta where she played a superhero, which spun off into a television series. In the noon-time television show MTB: Ang Saya Saya she was one of the lead hosts. In prime-time teleseries, she played an important role in the TV remake of Bituing Walang Ningning as Dorina's mother. She has also acted in the films Ang Cute Ng Ina Mo, Ang Tanging Ina N'yong Lahat and Pasukob.

She also released her first album on Star Records, entitled Ang Tanging Ina Nyo; this featured six novelty tunes. During the November 9 episode of ASAP 19, she premiered her song "Nandito Lang Ako", and revealed that she would be going under the stage name of ADA.

Return to GMA Network
After almost two decades of working with ABS-CBN, delas Alas decided to return to GMA Network, signing a two-year exclusive contract. One of the deciding factors for her move was the lack of projects for her from the Kapamilya Network. Her last show on ABS-CBN was the remake of Dyesebel alongside Anne Curtis.

Her return was celebrated in the Sunday-noontime show Sunday All Stars, where she was warmly welcomed as the newest Kapuso. As her first project, Delas Alas joined the cast of GMA's Telebabad series Let The Love Begin, in which she played the mother of Ruru Madrid. The show's final episode aired on August 7, 2015.

Delas Alas is also one of the main hosts and comedians in the newest Sunday afternoon comedy variety show Sunday PinaSaya, alongside Marian Rivera and the comedy duo Jose Manalo and Wally Bayola. Sunday PinaSaya challenged its rival variety show, ASAP 20 of ABS-CBN Corporation. Delas Alas is also one of the hosts of GMA Network's celebrity talk show CelebriTV, which replaced the longest-running celebrity talk show Startalk. She hosts this alongside Joey De Leon, Lolit Solis, and Ricky Lo. The show premiered on September 19, 2015.

Aside from television shows in the Kapuso Network, Delas Alas also joined international shows in Canada and the United States through GMA Pinoy TV. She was one of the guests in the 10th anniversary of GMA Pinoy TV.

After the successful Enteng ng Ina Mo with Vic Sotto in 2011, delas Alas and Sotto reappeared in the romantic comedy My Bebe Love, released in December 2015. Directed by Jose Javier Reyes, it features the Eat Bulaga! love team of Alden Richards and AlDub (Maine Mendoza).

In June 2020, Delas Alas signed a contract with GMA Artist Center.

2017–present, GMA Records
In November 2017, de las Alas signed a contract with GMA Records and released a single titled "Walang Pinipili".

Controversy

Quezon City persona non grata declaration 
Ai-Ai delas Alas was declared a persona non grata after a resolution approved on June 7, 2022. The Quezon City Council stated that delas Alas along with the controversial director Darryl Yap have defaced the Quezon City’s triangular seal in a video posted on Yap’s Vincentiments Facebook Page. The resolution noted that City's seal was defaced due to the additions of the initials "BBM" and "Sara", which referred to President-Elect Bongbong Marcos and Vice-President Elect Sara Duterte. Both of whom supported the mayoral campaign of Mike Defensor in Quezon City. The video was initially posted as a campaign video for Mike Defensor who ran and lost against the incumbent mayor, Joy Belmonte.  Lagman noted that the Quezon City seal has been the official coat of arms of the city since it was approved by the Office of the President and adopted by the City Council on February 3, 1997, through Resolution No. 10320, S-1975.

One of the provincial board members said that this resolution, contrary to what happens in general, is not aimed at prohibiting Ai-Ai from the locality but it has been passed for expressing the official sentiment towards her.

The camp of Ai-Ai delas Alas condemned the resolution and said that it "endangers the protection granted by the freedom of expression for artists, entertainers, content creators, and comedians who use satire or parody to express sentiments or criticize public acts or figures".

Other ventures

As a film producer
Delas Alas has produced some of the films in which she has starred.

List of films co-produced by Ai-Ai delas Alas
Enteng ng Ina Mo, co-produced by ABS-CBN Film Productions, Inc., M - Zet TV Productions, Inc., OctoArts Films and APT Entertainment; with Vic Sotto
Sisterakas, co-produced by ABS-CBN Film Productions, Inc. and Viva Films; with Vice Ganda and Kris Aquino
Kung Fu Divas, co-produced by ABS-CBN Film Productions, Inc., Reality Entertainment and The O&Co. Picture Factory; with Marian Rivera, who was also a producer of the film.

MEDA Productions
Martina Eileen Delas Alas Productions, also known as MEDA Productions, is a film production company in the Philippines managed by delas Alas.

Theatrical featured films of MEDA Productions
My Bebe Love #KiligPaMore (December 25, 2015) co-produced by OctoArts Films, M - Zet TV Productions, Inc., APT Entertainment and GMA Films; starring Vic Sotto, Ai-Ai delas Alas, Alden Richards and Maine Mendoza

As a talent manager
Ai-Ai delas Alas was the manager of the Filipino hiphop collective Ex Battalion for a brief period of time, from June 2018 to May 2019.

The former manager reportedly relinquished her role to the group's original leader, Mark Maglasang due to the unprofessional and disobedient attitude of most of the members. According to her, she has been putting up with their behavior for 9 months already, characterized with continuous absence in meeting sessions and disrespectful behaviour displayed by other members when reprimanded. "I can only do so much. If they want their group to prosper, then I guess they must change themselves first. I can't help them if they won't help themselves", she insisted.

Filmography

Film

Television

Awards and nominations

Honours
  Recipient of the Pro Ecclesia et Pontifice

References

External links

1964 births
Living people
20th-century Filipino women singers
21st-century Filipino women singers
ABS-CBN personalities
Actresses from Batangas
Far Eastern University alumni
Filipino film actresses
Filipino television actresses
Filipino women comedians
GMA Network personalities
Singers from Batangas
Star Circle Quest